Caloil Inc v Canada (AG) is a leading constitutional decision of the Supreme Court of Canada on the Trade and Commerce power under section 91(2) of the Constitution Act, 1867. The Court upheld a federal law prohibiting the transport or sale of imported oil in a certain region of Ontario.

Background
In 1970, the National Energy Board Act was amended to extend its scope to cover oil, and regulations were issued to provide that an importer of gasoline could not transport it across a line, generally coinciding with the Ontario-Quebec border, without a license from the Board. Upon being refused a new license because of failure to comply with terms attached to previous licenses, Caloil obtained a declaration from the Exchequer Court stating that the regulatory scheme was unconstitutional within the framework previously determined in the Margarine Reference.

The regulations were subsequently revised to provide that imports of gasoline could be shipped into an area of Canada specified in the conditions of a license granted by the Board. Caloil returned to the court for a declaratory action for avoidance, with the Attorney General of Canada as defendant and the National Energy Board as mis-en-cause.

At the Exchequer Court
Dumoulin J dismissed the action and ruled that the legislative scheme was intra vires federal jurisdiction. As he noted in his judgment,

Caloil appealed the decision to the Supreme Court.

At the Supreme Court of Canada

At the end of the hearing, Fauteux CJ immediately announced the Court's decision:

In subsequent written reasons, Pigeon J noted that Dumoulin J's comments with respect to the nature of jurisdictions had to be read with what Lord Tomlin had stated in the Fish Canneries Reference:

Citing more recent SCC jurisprudence, he then declared:

Pigeon held that the policy intended to be implemented was a control of the imports of a given commodity to foster the development and utilization of Canadian oil resources. Under the circumstances, the interference with local trade cannot be termed an unwarranted invasion of provincial jurisdiction.

In his concurring opinion, Laskin J stated that the authority of Parliament to regulate importation of goods was validly exercised in this case, in including as part of the regulatory scheme a provision restricting the area of distribution of the goods within Canada by their importer.

Impact
Caloil has been seen as representing a greater willingness by the Supreme Court to regulate local transactions under the federal trade and commerce power, in order to allow regulatory schemes with respect to interprovincial and international trade. However, it can also be viewed as allowing such regulation only with respect to imported goods, and not to those that are domestically produced.

More recent jurisprudence, however, suggests that such a view may be too restrictive. As the Quebec Court of Appeal observed in answering provincial reference questions in proceedings parallel to those in Reference re Securities Act, citing Caloil as one of the authorities:

References

Bibliography
 
 

Canadian federalism case law
Supreme Court of Canada cases
1971 in Canadian case law